Non-B DB is a database integrating annotations and analysis of non-B DNA-forming sequence motifs. The database provides alternative DNA structure predictions including Z-DNA motifs, quadruplex-forming motifs, inverted repeats, mirror repeats and direct repeats and their associated subsets of cruciforms, triplex and slipped structures, respectively.

See also
 B-DNA

References

External links
 http://nonb.abcc.ncifcrf.gov.

Biological databases
DNA
Biophysics
Molecular structure
Helices